Epalxis is an extinct genus of sea snails, marine gastropod mollusks in the family Turridae, the turrids.

Typespecies
Cossmann stated the type species of Epalxis to be Pleurotoma crenulata Lamarck, 1804; however he used the latter name in the sense of Deshayes (1834). P. crenulata in the sense of Deshayes and Cossmann is in fact Pleurotoma ventricosa Lamarck, 1804. Brebion [1992, Cossmanniana, Hors-série 1] accepted P. ventricosa as the type species of Epalxis, and Tracey et al. (2019) accepted Brebion's type species fixation under Art. 70.3 and 86.1.1 of the Code. However, Art. 70.3 cannot be applied retroactively to Brebion's type species fixation. Tracey et al. should have invoked Art. 70.3 in their own right if they chose to do so. For the time being, this leaves Pleurotoma crenulata Lamarck, 1804, as the type species of Epalxis by OD.

Species
Species within the genus Epalxis include:
 † Epalxis bouryi Tucker & Renard, 1993 
 † Epalxis crenata (J.G. Bruguière, 179 ) 
 † Epalxis edwardsi H.I. Tucker & J. Le Renard
 † Epalxis lima (F.E. Edwards, 1861)
 † Epalxis multigyrata (G.P. Deshayes, 1865)
 † Epalxis reticulosa  F.E. Edwards  
 † Epalxis symondsi Tracey & Craig, 2019 
 † Epalxis toddi Tracey & Craig, 2019 
 † Epalxis ventricosa (Lamarck, 1804) 
 Species brought into synonymy
 † Epalxis rosenkrantzi Hansen, 2019: synonym of † Fusulculus hanseni Pacaud, 2020 (invalid: secondary junior homonym of Fusulculus rosenkrantzi (Traub, 1979))

References

 Powell, A. W. B. 1964. The family Turridae in the Indo-Pacific. Indo-Pacific Mollusca 1. (5): 227-346; 1 (7): 409-454.
 Tracey S., Craig B. & Gain O. (2019). Turridae (Gastropoda, Conoidea) from the late Lutetian Eocene of the Cotentin, NW France: endemism through loss of planktotrophy?. Carnets de Voyages Paléontologiques dans le Bassin Anglo-Parisien. 5: 101-140.
 Pacaud J.M. (2020). Fusulculus hanseni nom. nov., un nouveau nom de remplacement pour Epalxis ? rosenkrantzi Hansen, 2019 non Fusulculus rosenkrantzi (Traub, 1979) (Mollusca, Gastropoda, Benthobiidae). Folia Conchyliologica. 54: 7-11.

External links
 Cossmann M. (1889). Catalogue illustré des coquilles fossiles de l'Éocène des environs de Paris. Annales de la Société Royale Malacologique de Belgique. 24: 3-381, 12 pls.
 Pacaud J.M. & Le Renard J. (1995). Révision des Mollusques paléogènes du Bassin de Paris. IV- Liste systématique actualisée. Cossmanniana. 3(4): 151-187
 Worldwide Mollusc Species Data Base: Turridae

Turridae
Gastropod genera